Commissioned port vessels of the Royal New Zealand Navy from its formation on 1 October 1941 to the present. This includes examination and boom defence vessels, mine defence and degaussing ships and port tugs and tow boats

Examination vessels

Boom defence vessels

In addition there were five smaller boom defence launches. These were in charge of a petty officer and therefore not truly commissioned.

Mine defence and degaussing ships

In addition another seven smaller launches functioned in mine defence and degaussing roles.

Tugs and tow boats

See also
 Current Royal New Zealand Navy ships
 List of ships of the Royal New Zealand Navy

References

 McDougall, R J  (1989) New Zealand Naval Vessels. Page 134–141. Government Printing Office. 

Auxiliary ships of the Royal New Zealand Navy